Copiapoa coquimbana is a species of clump-forming cactus native to South America. The species is named after the city of Coquimbo in Chile. Variations include C. coquimbana var. wagenknechtii, C. coquimbana var. vallenarensis, and C. coquimbana subsp. andina.

References
 
 
 
 

Cacti of South America
Flora of northern Chile
Cactoideae